The Deichselbach is a stream in Upper Franconia, Germany. It is about 12 kilometers long.

Course 
The Deichselbach has its source east of the village Tiefenhöchstadt in the community of Buttenheim. In Altendorf, the stream passes under the Rhine–Main–Danube Canal and then flows into the Regnitz.

The stream runs through the following places:
 Tiefenhöchstadt
 Frankendorf
 Stackendorf
 Gunzendorf (constituent community of Buttenheim)
 Dreuschendorf
 Buttenheim
 Altendorf

References

Rivers of Bavaria
Rivers of Germany